Alluaudia montagnacii is a rare species of flowering plants belonging to the family Didiereaceae.

Description

The tall columnar central trunk sprouts strong vertical branches. Stem and branches have symmetrically arranged leaves, about 1.5 cm long, and black-tipped thorns, 2–2.5 cm long. Leaves are deciduous in the long dry season. Photosynthesis is carried on by the stems. This plant is well adapted to live where water is a limiting environmental factor. The flowers are small, green or yellow.

Distribution
This plant is endemic to southwestern plain of Madagascar.

Habitat
Alluaudia montagnacii grows in small arid and subarid areas in a narrow belt of the coast. It is part of the Madagascar spiny forests, where it forms a specific plant community with Euphorbia intisy and Euphorbia stenoclada.

References

Didiereaceae
Endemic flora of Madagascar
Plants described in 1961
Flora of the Madagascar spiny thickets